231045-0637 is a rock album released in 1979 by Kim Larsen, a Danish rock musician.

While Kim Larsen was a member of Gasolin' he released three solo albums, Værsgo, Kim Larsen og Yankee drengene and Starfuckers: Vogt dem for efterligninger. The three albums differ on some main points: Værsgo is sung in Danish with sparse orchestration; Kim Larsen og Yankee drengene is sung in English and recorded with American session musicians in Atlanta, and Starfuckers is a casual and jolly live recording. The three albums proved that Kim Larsen was a valid musician in his own right.

231045-0637 (his personal identification number) was his first post-Gasolin' release, and it became a big seller in Denmark and confirmed his status as one of the best Danish songwriters. All 12 songs are very strong and Dagen før, Blip-Båt, Ud i det blå and Køb bananer are classic songs. The album (released in 1979) was recorded in Sweet Silence studios in Copenhagen and was produced by Nils Henriksen. The music on this album is unlike the hard rock of Gasolin' more poppish and is the start of the electronic sounds that would dominate his next records such as Jungle Dreams and Midt om natten. Musically 231045-0637 is a combination of the music he made in the 1970s and the music he would make in the 1980s.

Track listing

Charts

Certifications and sales

References

Kim Larsen albums
1979 albums
Danish-language albums
CBS Records albums